Sutton, originally de Sutton, is an English toponymic surname.  One origin is from Anglo-Saxon where it is derived from sudh, suth, or suð, and tun referring to the generic placename "southern farm".  Note that almost every county in England contains one or more placenames bearing the prefix "Sutton".  The Domesday Book (1086) contains the first recorded spelling of the surname as "Ketel de Sudtone"; "Suttuna" also appeared in 1086 in records from Ely, Cambridgeshire.  In 1379 tax records, the surname appears as "de Sutton" ("of Southtown").  One source refers to the origin as being Anglo-Norman, with the name itself derived as described above, from Anglo-Saxon terms.

Related surnames include early variants "de Sudtone" (1086), "Suttuna" (1086), "de Sutton" (1379), and "de Sutun".  Additional variants include "Suton" and "Suttone".

The Sutton are ancestors to the Dudley.

This surname is shared by the following notable people:

Born in the 13th century
Drew de Sutton (fl. 13th century), lord of the Manor of Thorncote, England
Geoffrey de Sutton (fl. 13th century), lord of the Manor of Tockholes, England
John de Sutton (fl. 1306), MP for Essex
Thomas of Sutton (or Thomas de Sutton) (fl. 1274–aft 1315), Dominican friar and theologian

Born in the 14th century

Allan Sutton (fl. 14th century), Member of Parliament

Matrin de Sutton (fl. 15th century), first rector of Church of St George, Beckington
Hugh de Sutton (fl. 14th century), Prior of Christ Church Cathedral, Ireland
John de Sutton II (1310–1359), 1st Baron Sutton of Dudley
John de Sutton III (1339 – c. 1370), 2nd Baron Sutton of Dudley
John de Sutton IV (1361–1396), 3rd Baron Sutton of Dudley
John de Sutton V (1380–1406), 4th Baron Sutton of Dudley
John Sutton of Lincoln (d. c. 1391), English politician

Born in the 15th century
John Sutton, 1st Baron Dudley (1400–1487)
John Sutton (composer) (fl. 15th century), English composer
Edward Sutton, 2nd Baron Dudley (c. 1460 – 1531)

Born in the 16th century
Thomas Sutton (1532–1611), British merchant and civil servant

Born in the 17th century
Richard Sutton (British Army officer) (1674–1737), Major-General and Member of Parliament. Brother of Robert Sutton
Robert Sutton (diplomat) (1671–1746), British diplomat, clergyman and Member of Parliament

Born in the 18th century

Charles Sutton (1756–1846), British clergyman and botanist
John Sutton (merchant) (1777–1863), founder of Suttons Seeds
Samuel Sutton (1760–1832), Royal Navy admiral

Born in the 19th century
Bertine Sutton (1886–1946), British air marshal
Charles Sutton (1891–1962), English cricketer and British Army officer
Edith Sutton (1862–1957), first woman councillor in England, Mayor of Reading and suffragist
George Lowe Sutton (1872–1964), Australian agricultural scientist
George Miksch Sutton (1898–1982), American ornithologist and bird artist
John Edward Sutton (1862–1945), British politician
Joseph William Sutton (1844–1914), British emigrant to Australia, shipbuilder, inventor, X-ray pioneer
Thomas Sutton (photographer) (1819–1875), English photographer, author, and inventor
Walter Sutton (1877–1916), American biologist

Born in the 20th century
Andy Sutton (born 1975), Canadian ice hockey player
Antony C. Sutton (1925–2002), historian and author
Brett Sutton (born c. 1960), Australian triathlon coach
Brett Sutton (doctor) (born 1968/1969), Australian public health doctor
Cameron Sutton (born 1995), American football player
Carol Sutton (1944–2020), American actress
Charles Sutton (cricketer, born 1906) (1906–1945), Anglo-Chilean cricketer
Chloe Sutton (born 1992), American swimmer
Chris Sutton (born 1973), English footballer
Courtland Sutton (born 1995), American football player
Crystal Lee Sutton (1940–2009), American union organizer and advocate, inspiration for the film Norma Rae
Deirdre Sutton (fl. 1960s) (Irish name Deirdre de Sutún), Irish sportsperson
Dominique Sutton (born 1986), American basketball player 
Don Sutton (1945–2021), Major League Baseball pitcher and sports broadcaster
Dudley Sutton (1933–2018), English actor
Eddie Sutton (1936–2020), college men's basketball coach
Eugene Sutton (born 1954) Episcopal bishop of Maryland 
Frank Sutton (1923–1974), actor
Graham Sutton (1972), an English musician, songwriter, composer and record producer
Greg Sutton (basketball) (born 1967), former American basketball player
Greg Sutton (soccer) (born 1977), Canadian soccer goalkeeper
Hal Sutton (born 1958) American Pro Golfer
Jason Sutton OBE (born 1966), Royal Air Force Regiment Officer
James Sutton (born 1983), English actor
Jeffrey Sutton (born 1960), American federal judge 
Jeff Sutton (real estate developer) (born 1960), New York real estate developer
Jim Sutton (born 1941), New Zealand politician
Joe Sutton, American playwright
John Sutton (actor) (1908–1963), British—Indian actor
John F. Sutton Jr., American lawyer
John Sutton (baseball) (born 1952), American sportsperson
John Sutton (economist) (born 1948), British academic
John Sutton (geologist) (1919–1992), British geologist
John Sutton (hurler) (Irish name Seán de Sutún), Irish sportsperson
John Sutton (RAF officer) (1932–2014), British military officer
John Sutton (rugby league) (born 1984), Australian Rugby League player
John Jay Sutton (1949–2011), aka Oliver Humperdink, American professional wrestling manager
John R. Sutton (born 1949), American academic
Johnny Sutton (born 1961), United States Attorney
Julie Sutton (mayor) (born 1937), Australian former mayor and councillor of Warringah council
Kathy Sutton, married name of Kathy Cox (skydiver)
Keith Sutton (bishop) (1934–2017), bishop of Lichfield, England
Laurie S. Sutton (born 1953), American writer of comic books and children's books
Len Sutton (1925–2006),  American racecar driver
Loree K. Sutton, American general and politician
Matt Sutton (born 1984), radio announcer in Australia
Mel Sutton, former English footballer
Mike Sutton (basketball) (born 1956), American basketball player
Mike Sutton (criminologist) (born 1959), English criminologist
Mike Sutton (footballer) (born 1944), former English footballer
Nicholas Sutton (born 1969), English property developer
Oliver Graham Sutton (1903–1977), a Welsh mathematician and meteorologist
Paul Sutton (1910–1970), American actor
Paul Alexander Sutton (born 1956), British businessman
Richard S. Sutton, computer scientist, identified as one of the founders of modern reinforcement learning
Ritchie Sutton (born 1986), English footballer
Roger Sutton (born 1964/1965), New Zealand business leader
Sarah Sutton (born 1961), English actress
Shelton B. Sutton Jr. (1919–1942), United States Navy officer for whom more than one U.S. Navy ship has been named
Steve Sutton (footballer) (born 1961), English footballer
Steve Sutton (skydiver), Canadian skydiver
Tierney Sutton (born 1963), American jazz singer
Tyrell Sutton (born 1986), Northwestern Wildcat running back
Valerie Sutton (born 1951), American developer of movement notation and a former dancer
Ward Sutton, American political cartoonist
Will Sutton (born 1991), American football player
Willie Sutton (1901–1980), American bank robber and prison escape-artist

See also 
 Sutton baronets
 Disambiguation pages
 Alan Sutton
 Albert Sutton (disambiguation)
 Anthony Sutton (disambiguation)
 Brian Sutton (disambiguation)
 Charles Sutton (disambiguation)
 Chris Sutton
 Claire Sutton (disambiguation)
 Clarence Sutton (disambiguation)
 David Sutton (disambiguation)
 Edward Sutton (disambiguation)
 Elizabeth Sutton (disambiguation)
 George Sutton (disambiguation)
 Greg Sutton (disambiguation)
 Henry Sutton (disambiguation)
 John Sutton
 Julia Sutton (disambiguation)
 Keith Sutton
 Kelly Sutton
 Laura Sutton (disambiguation)
 Michael Sutton (disambiguation)
 Mickey Sutton (disambiguation)
 Nicholas Sutton
 Oliver Sutton (disambiguation)
 Peter Sutton (disambiguation)
 Philip Sutton (disambiguation)
 Rachel Sutton (disambiguation)
 Richard Sutton (disambiguation)
 Robert Sutton (disambiguation)
 Steve Sutton (disambiguation)
 Thomas Sutton
 William Sutton (disambiguation)

References

Surnames
English-language surnames
English toponymic surnames
Surnames of English origin